Staz Nair is a British actor and singer. He is known for his roles on the TV series Game of Thrones and Supergirl.

Life and career 
Nair is of Malayali and Russian descent. He was a part of the band Times Red. The band were contestants in the ninth series of the British music competition television series The X Factor in 2012, advancing to the judges' houses round, during which they did not become a finalist. The band released their debut single, titled "Just No Good for Me", in March 2013.

Nair joined the fantasy drama television series Game of Thrones beginning in its sixth season as Qhono, a Dothraki army chief. He portrayed the titular Rocky in the television film The Rocky Horror Picture Show: Let's Do the Time Warp Again, which premiered on Fox in October 2016. In 2019, Nair portrayed Dax-Baron, the man who would become the supervillain Doomsday, in the series Krypton. He became a main cast member of the superhero television series Supergirl during its fifth season in 2019, portraying a character created for the series: "hardened reporter" William Dey. Nair is set to appear in the fantasy film Rebel Moon, directed by Zack Snyder.

Filmography

Film

Television

References

External links 
 

Living people
21st-century British male actors
21st-century British singers
British male actors of Indian descent
British male television actors
British people of Russian descent
1991 births